Tom Reese (August 8, 1928 – December 12, 2017) was an American actor who appeared in many westerns on both the big- and small-screens.

Early life

Reese's father and uncle were country-western singers known as "The Allen Brothers," who traveled and performed bluegrass music with the family. Reese served two tours in the United States Marine Corps, and was a military policeman. His G.I. Bill enabled him to study dramatics at the American Theater Wing. Reese spent fifteen years on the road working nightclubs, studied with Lee Strasberg, and performed off-Broadway and in local TV shows.

Career

His film debut was in John Cassavetes' New York-made Shadows (1958). His next film credit was in the Elvis Presley western Flaming Star (1960). His early film credits also include, Marines, Let's Go (1961), 40 Pounds of Trouble (1962), and Murderers' Row (1966), among others. In 2009 Reese played the part of Inspector Riley in Dark and Stormy Night, an independent film that spoofs both the haunted house and murder mystery genres.

For his television debut in 1959, Cassavetes also cast Reese in an episode of his detective series Johnny Staccato. He would go on to make guest appearances in shows such as Bonanza, Branded, Charlie's Angels, Eight Is Enough, Emergency!, The Fugitive, Gunsmoke, The Guns of Will Sonnett, Have Gun – Will Travel, The High Chaparral, Knight Rider, Kung Fu, Laredo, Lawman, Mannix, Police Woman, Rawhide, Simon & Simon, The Six Million Dollar Man, The Twilight Zone, The Untouchables, The Virginian, The Wild Wild West, and Wonder Woman, among others.

His television career also includes miniseries and movies, such as Dick Tracy (1967), The Hollywood Detective (1989), Once an Eagle (1976), Six Against the Rock (1987), Stranger on the Run (1967), and The Virginia Hill Story (1974) about the real-life girlfriend of mobster Bugsy Siegel.

From 1975 to 1976, Reese had a recurring role as Sergeant Thomas Velie in the television series Ellery Queen. He also appeared in three episodes of The Red Hand Gang (1977) as Dolan's Partner.

At 6'3" and around 230 pounds, Reese has been in a number of notable fight scenes, going up against characters portrayed by other large actors, including James Arness, Chuck Connors, Mike Connors, Tony Curtis, Glen Ford, Roy Jenson, Dean Martin, Doug McClure, and Elvis Presley, among others. In a comedic fight opposite Woody Allen in Sleeper (1973), Reese was out of action for twelve weeks after being injured.

Death

Reese died in December 2017 of an illness in Studio City, California, at the age of 89.

Filmography

Film

 Shadows''' (1958) as Tom

 Flaming Star (1960) as Jute

 Marines, Let's Go (1961) as Pfc. Desmond "Let's Go" McCaffrey

 40 Pounds of Trouble (1962) as Bassett / Uncle Norman

 The Money Trap (1966) as Matthews

 Murderers' Row (1966) as Ironhead 

 The Greatest Story Ever Told (1965) as Thomas

 Vanishing Point (1971) as Sheriff

 Blood on the Arrow (1964) as Charlie

 Taggart (1964) as Vince August

 The St. Valentine's Day Massacre (1967) as Ted Newberry

 Support Your Local Sheriff! (1969) as Gunfighter (uncredited)

 The Outfit (1973) as Hit Man

 The Wild Party (1975) as Eddy

 North Dallas Forty (1979) as Coach Waddy

 Dark and Stormy Night'' (2009) as Inspector Riley

Television

References

External links 

1928 births
2017 deaths
American male film actors
American male television actors
20th-century American male actors
Western (genre) television actors